Ode to a Dying DJ is a DJ mix album, mixed by Mark Rae, released by trustthedj independent record label and website. The album is a mix of Jamaican dancehall as well as the staple Grand Central style UK hip hop.

Track listing
 "Ton Of Bricks" - Tipper
 "Till I Left The Music" (Mark Rae remix) (featuring Marshmello) - The Funky Lowlives
 "Hot Like We" - Cecile
 "Nuff Time To Waste" (featuring YZ) - ARP
 "String Vibe" (Nikodemis & Osiris NY Hipharmonic remix) - Plastyc Buddha
 "Walk In Space" - Fingathing
 "Mind, Body & Soul" - Mark Rae
 "Blackout" - Buccaneer & Blaxx / "The Quickness" (accapella) (featuring Rusty Ps) - The Nudge
 "Dirty Shirt" - ARP /  "Picture Dis" (accapella) - Vybz Kartel
 "Medicine" (Kraak & Smaak remix) - Mark Rae
 "Loose Lips" (featuring Lyric L) - Seiji
 "Blaze & Cook" - Stereotyp meets Al'Haca
 "Nice Up" - Black Grass
 "Get With It" - Overproof Soundsystem
 "He’s Not Dead" (Skit)

External links
Trust The DJ website

Mark Rae albums
DJ mix albums
2005 compilation albums